Pigs Is Pigs is a 1937 Warner Bros. Merrie Melodies cartoon directed by Friz Freleng. The short was released on January 30, 1937.

Synopsis 
Piggy Hamhock is always hungry, thinking of eating and stealing food whenever he can. Piggy's mother is continuously vexed by his seemingly insatiable appetite and inability to control himself. Piggy's gluttony causes problems which give his mother and the rest of his large family considerable annoyance, especially at mealtimes. After he eats his siblings' spaghetti meals at dinner, Piggy's mother scolds him and warns Piggy that he will burst someday if he continues his bad eating habits.

After falling asleep following dinner, Piggy enters a dream sequence where he meets a mysterious old man who offers him a large feast, at which Piggy is delighted. The old man is revealed to be a mad scientist, who straps Piggy into a mechanical chair and plots to use Piggy as a test subject for his experiments. The intention of the experiment is revealed when the scientist unveils his "Feed-A-Matic" machine, which he plans to use to force-feed Piggy as much food as he can hold. The scientist uses the Feed-A-Matic to continuously force-feed Piggy using soup, olives, bananas, pies, sandwiches, and ice cream until Piggy is morbidly obese and bulging out of the chair.

The mad scientist is amazed at this and pokes Piggy's huge belly, then he asks if he's had enough, to which Piggy says yes. The scientist releases him and Piggy waddles to the door, but then notices the food which the scientist used to bait him earlier and his hunger gets the better of him. He takes one of the turkey's drumsticks and eats it, but immediately explodes.

Piggy wakes up in his bed immediately thereafter, relieved that he is all right. Piggy then responds to his mother calling him to breakfast—but quickly devours his meal, apparently having already forgotten his lesson.

See also 
 Gluttony
 Mr Creosote
 Merrie Melodies
 Termite Terrace
 Looney Tunes and Merrie Melodies filmography (1929–1939)
 Treehouse of Horror IV

References

External links 
 A Publicity Still.
 Another Publicity Still.
 
 

1937 films
Merrie Melodies short films
Warner Bros. Cartoons animated short films
Films about nightmares
Short films directed by Friz Freleng
Piggy (Merrie Melodies) films
Mad scientist films
American black-and-white films
1937 animated films
1930s Warner Bros. animated short films